Ken Magowan (born June 22, 1981) is a Canadian former professional ice hockey player, who was active in Germany's highest level hockey league, the DEL, for six years. He was selected by the New Jersey Devils in the seventh round (198th overall) of the 2000 NHL Entry Draft.

Playing career
From 1998-2000 he played as a junior with Vernon Vipers in the British Columbia Hockey League. He scored 46 goals and 62 assists in 118 games and won the 1999 Royal Bank Cup with his team. From 2000 he appeared in four seasons with Boston University Terriers and scored in 118 games 31 goals and 35 assists for the US-College team.

In 2004, he played his first professional season, but there was not much opportunities for him with the Devil's AHL affiliation Albany River Rats. So he spent the next three seasons mostly in the ECHL with Augusta Lynx and Toledo Storm. In this time he represented his teams two times (2005, 2007) in the ECHL All-Star Game.  and got AHL try outs with Philadelphia Phantoms, Rochester Americans and Bridgeport Sound Tigers. 
 
For season 2007-08 he changed to Europe and played for SC Riessersee in Germans second level hockey league. In 50 games he scored 26 goals and 24 assists and so he could find a team in Germans highest level hockey league DEL for the next season. In the next 6 years Magowan played in the DEL for Grizzlys Wolfsburg and Adler Mannheim. In his first DEL-season he was best goal scorer of the league (29 goals)  and the following three seasons always one of the best goal scorer from his team. In his last two DEL years he was often injured.

In season 2014-15 he started with Löwen Frankfurt in Germans second-level hockey league DEL2 and finished the season with Vienna Capitals in Austrias highest level hockey league.  
In season 2015-16 he played with Lausitzer Füchse in DEL2 again. For this Saxony team he scored 10 goals and 9 assists in 28 games.

Career statistics

References

External links

1981 births
Living people
Adler Mannheim players
Albany River Rats players
Augusta Lynx players
Boston University Terriers men's ice hockey players
Bridgeport Sound Tigers players
Canadian ice hockey left wingers
Ice hockey people from British Columbia
Lausitzer Füchse players
Löwen Frankfurt players
New Jersey Devils draft picks
Philadelphia Phantoms players
SC Riessersee players
Rochester Americans players
Sportspeople from Kelowna
Toledo Storm players
Vernon Vipers players
Vienna Capitals players
Grizzlys Wolfsburg players
Canadian expatriate ice hockey players in Austria
Canadian expatriate ice hockey players in Germany